Bharathi Vidya Bhavan is a co-educational residential senior secondary school in Erode in the state of Tamil Nadu, India. The school is a blend of classrooms, beautiful greenery, and open playgrounds.
It is run by the family of Bharat Ratna Chidambaram Subramaniam (also known as C. Subramaniam). The correspondent of this school is Dr. L.M. Ramakrishnan, first ENT doctor of Erode and also elder son in law of CS, the President is Dr. Aruna Ramakrishnan, daughter of Chidambaram Subramaniam. It is the top school in Erode district focusing on both academics and sports. The school's principals are Mr. Xavier and Mr. Sridhar handling the management and academics respectively.
   
It follows the State Board of Tamil Nadu. It has two branches in Erode which follows Central Board of Secondary Education-The BVB School and CS Academy.

Infrastructure
There are labs for every subject and the school has a hostel facility. The management of the hostel is looked after by Mrs Saraswathy.

In the 11th grade, subjects like Commerce, Biology, Computer Science, Sanskrit, Tamil, Hindi, English, and vocational education are offered.
There is compulsory art of living courses for students of all classes.

It has a basketball court, clay tennis court, swimming pool, assembly area, mini stadium and a football ground.

Houses
The school students are divided into four houses and interhouse competitions are held each year. Students are nominated as office bearers leading the houses in order to teach leadership qualities. The name of the houses are Gandhi, Tagore, Nehru and Vivekananda.

Extra-curricular activities
Here, the students are referred as Bharathians. Bharathians play inter-school matches in sports like basketball, volleyball, tennis, table tennis, football and athletics. It has an indoor stadium for basketball, badminton, and volleyball.

Co-curricular activities include drawing, painting, handicraft, sewing and vocal and instrumental music.

See also
 SSVM Institutions

Boarding schools in Tamil Nadu
High schools and secondary schools in Tamil Nadu
Schools in Erode district
Education in Erode
Educational institutions established in 1979
1979 establishments in Tamil Nadu